A Brand report card is a process, which may be used by the companies to periodically audit their brands’ strengths and weaknesses on certain relevant product characteristics and comparing these with the strong brands in the same product category.
Kevin Lane Keller in a HBR article (2000)has identified 10 attributes that would measure the strength of the brands and constructed a report card.

The traits can be listed as follows:

 The brand excels at delivering the benefits customers truly desire -  Branding brings in the relationship between the way we project our products and the way customers accept it. It is very important to understand what the customers actually want and deliver the same.
 The brand stays relevant - Keep pace with the requirements of the customer's preference which is subject to change periodically a thus stay relevant.
 The pricing strategy is based on consumers’ perceptions of value - Value pricing should not be adopted at the expense of essential brand-building activities
 The brand is properly positioned - Studies the strength on the basis of two variables  - point of parity (thereby neutralizing the competitors’ advantages) and point of difference (thereby achieving advantages over competitors)
 The brand is consistent - Keeping the right balance between continuance in marketing activities and the kind of change needed to stay relevant
 The brand portfolio and hierarchy make sense - Studies the strength of the brand based on its portfolio and the way it is arrived at. Single product lines are often sold under different brand names, and different brands within a company hold different powers.
 The brand makes use of and coordinates a full range of marketing activities to build equity - Measures the ability of the brand to reach the target customers and create value and thereby create brand equity.
 The brand’s managers understand what the brand means to consumers - If its clear what customers like and don’t like about a brand, and what core associations are linked to the brand, then it should also be clear whether any given action will reinforce the brand or create friction
 The brand is given proper support and that support is sustained over the long run
 The company monitors sources of brand equity - Creating brand equity is not an easy job but sustaining it is tougher. Strong brands generally make good and frequent use of in-depth brand audits and ongoing brand-tracking studies.

Brand management